Capiro Calentura National Park is a national park in Honduras. It was established in 1992 and covers an area of 81 square kilometres.

References

National parks of Honduras
Protected areas established in 1992
1992 establishments in Honduras
Central American Atlantic moist forests